Carvoeiros is a settlement in the northern region of the island on São Nicolau, Cape Verde. It is situated on the north coast of São Nicolau, 2 km east of Queimadas and 4 km north of Ribeira Brava.

See also
List of villages and settlements in Cape Verde

References

Villages and settlements in São Nicolau, Cape Verde
Ribeira Brava, Cape Verde